Rhinoneura villosipes is a species of jewel damselfly in the family Chlorocyphidae.

The IUCN conservation status of Rhinoneura villosipes is "VU", vulnerable. The species faces a high risk of endangerment in the medium term.

References

Further reading

 

Chlorocyphidae
Articles created by Qbugbot
Insects described in 1915